Meyer Shank Racing (formerly Michael Shank Racing) is an American auto racing organization that competes in the IndyCar Series and IMSA SportsCar Championship.

History

Atlantic Championship
Michael Shank as an owner of Michael Shank Racing, he was a car owner for Sam Hornish Jr. when he won the 1999 Formula Atlantic series Rookie of the Year title. Shank has been twice named Formula Atlantic Team Owner of the Year.

Grand-Am
In 2004, Michael Shank Racing entered the Rolex Sports Car Series Daytona Prototype class with drivers Oswaldo Negri Jr. and Burt Frisselle, finishing 12th in the driver's classification.

In 2006, his car, driven by Justin Wilson, A. J. Allmendinger, Oswaldo Negri and Mark Patterson, finished in 2nd position overall and the Daytona Prototype class in the Rolex 24 Hours of Daytona and won in 2006 at Miller Motorsports Park. The team finished 8th in points in both 2006 and 2007, with John Pew becoming Negri's co-driver.

In 2008 the team finished 10th, winning the first race held at the New Jersey Motorsports Park and the last race of the season on Miller Motorsports Park.

They finished 8th in points in 2009 and 10th in 2010.

In 2011 the team improved to sixth place overall.

Michael Shank Racing won the 24 Hours of Daytona in 2012 with A. J. Allmendinger, Justin Wilson, John Pew and Oswaldo Negri as the team's drivers.

IMSA WeatherTech SportsCar Championship

In 2014 Grand-Am and the American Le Mans Series merged to form the United SportsCar Championship. Michael Shank Racing ran a single Riley Ford Ecoboost DP with drivers John Pew and Oswaldo Negri. In 2015 and 2016 the team entered a Ligier JS P2-HPD, claiming wins at Laguna Seca and Petit Le Mans in 2016.

The team switched to the GT Daytona class in 2017 and entered two factory-backed Acura NSX with drivers Oswaldo Negri Jr., Jeff Segal, Andy Lally and Katherine Legge, and wins two races in Belle Isle and Watkins Glen. Michael Shank Racing wins two races in 2018 in Belle Isle and Laguna Seca, finishing the season in second place overall.

In the 2019 season, having only one victory at Watkins Glen and four times finishing in 2nd place, he won the GT Daytona group title through drivers Mario Farnbacher and Trent Hindman.

IndyCar

The team purchased a 2012 Dallara IndyCar, with the goal of adding a full-time IndyCar program in 2012 while continuing its Grand-Am programs.

The original intention for the IndyCar program was to run under the name "MSR Indy", with A. J. Allmendinger and Brian Bailey as co-owners.

The 2012 program was intended to use the Lotus engines (later revealed to be uncompetitive) and field Jay Howard for the 2012 Indianapolis 500; however, despite having full sponsorship from Jim Beam, the failure to secure a competitive engine lease kept it from doing so.

Michael Shank Racing announced that it had sold its Dallara chassis to Sam Schmidt Motorsports in February 2013 and declared its intention to collaborate with another team on a 2013 Indianapolis 500 entry. No such program was finalized in time for the race.

For the 2017 Indianapolis 500, the team partnered with Andretti Autosport for an entry driven by Jack Harvey.

In the 2018 IndyCar Series, in a partnership with Schmidt Peterson Motorsports, the team entered Jack Harvey in 6 events, including the 2018 Indianapolis 500, and in 2019 in 10 races, obtaining the first podium, the 3rd place in the IndyCar Grand Prix.

On October 2, 2020, it was announced that Liberty Media's Formula One Group was making a minority equity investment in the team.

On May 30, 2021, Hélio Castroneves won the 2021 Indy 500 while racing for the team. This marked Castroneves' 4th Indy 500 victory (tied for most all time), and the team's first career victory in the IndyCar Series.

Hélio Castroneves and Simon Pagenaud competed for Meyer Shank in 2022.

Racing results

IndyCar Series
(key)

* Season still in progress

IMSA SportsCar Championship

Prototype

GT Daytona

IndyCar wins

WeatherTech SportsCar Championship wins

Overall

Class

References

External links

 

American auto racing teams
IndyCar Series teams
Auto racing teams established in 1989
1989 establishments in Ohio
American Le Mans Series teams
FIA World Endurance Championship teams
WeatherTech SportsCar Championship teams
Atlantic Championship teams
24 Hours of Le Mans teams